The 1977 Memphis State Tigers football team represented Memphis State University (now known as the University of Memphis) as an independent during the 1977 NCAA Division I football season. In its third season under head coach Richard Williamson, the team compiled a 6–5 record and outscored opponents by a total of 228 to 194. The team played its home games at Liberty Bowl Memorial Stadium in Memphis, Tennessee.  

The team's statistical leaders included Lloyd Patterson with 1,336 passing yards, James King with 626 rushing yards, Earnest Gray with 826 receiving yards, and Rusty Bennett with 60 points scored (21 extra points, 13 field goals).

Schedule

References

Memphis State
Memphis Tigers football seasons
Memphis State Tigers football